Kevin Brennan (born May 2, 1960) is an American stand-up comedian, podcaster and writer. He is the host of the Misery Loves Company podcast, and is best known for his work on Saturday Night Live Weekend Update in 1999 and 2000.

Brennan was voted "Best Comedian" at the 2005 Aspen Comedy Festival and his half-hour stand-up special was featured on the HBO that same year. He was a featured on the 2007 cross-Canada Just for Laughs comedy tour and performed at the Just for Laughs festival in Montreal in 2009. He was also a repeat panelist on Red Eye w/ Tom Shillue in 2016 and 2017.

Early life
Brennan was born in Chicago to an Irish Catholic family and has nine siblings. The family also lived in Philadelphia.

Career
Brennan first started stand-up in Chicago in the 1980s at the suggestion of a coworker at a restaurant where he was working. He moved to New York City in 1987 to further pursue a career in stand up comedy.

Within two years of moving to New York City, Brennan was hosting open mics and other comedy shows at the Boston Comedy Club (a now defunct comedy club in New York City.) By the early 1990s he was appearing on A&E's stand-up comedy series An Evening at the Improv and Caroline's Comedy Hour.

In 1993 Brennan appeared on the entertainment competition show Star Search where he competed against, and was beaten by, a 19 year old Dave Chappelle.

Brennan first appeared as a guest on Late Night with Conan O'Brien in 1994 and went on to make multiple appearances on the show from 1995 to 2007.

In 1997 Brennan appeared in a small role in the film Half Baked which was co-written by Chappelle and Kevin's brother Neal Brennan. By this time Brennan was well established in the New York comedy circuit and had appeared twice on Late Show with David Letterman. That same year the Brennan brothers had a development deal with NBC and Universal for a sitcom based on their own experiences growing up in an Irish-Catholic family with 10 kids in Philadelphia.

Brennan was a writer for Saturday Night Live in 1999 and 2000 and also appeared on the show as a Weekend Update correspondent in two episodes of the show's 25th season while Colin Quinn held the anchor post.  Quinn left Saturday Night Live in 2000 and Brennan was in contention for the anchor position, but after the job was given to Jimmy Fallon and Tina Fey and Brennan decided not to return as a writer for the following season.

From 2003 to 2005 Brennan made multiple appearances on Last Call with Carson Daly. Brennan was voted “Best Comedian” at the 2005 Aspen Comedy Festival, which lead to his half-hour stand-up special on the HBO series One Night Stand that same year. He was one of six comedians featured on the 2007 cross-Canada Just for Laughs comedy tour, which also featured Greg Behrendt, John Wing, Louis Ramey, Fiona O'Loughlin and Tom Papa. He also performed at the Just For Laughs festival in Montreal in 2009. In 2011, Brennan wrote for the Comedy Central series Sports Show with Norm Macdonald.

Misery Loves Company

Brennan started the comedic podcast titled Misery Loves Company (MLC) in January 2016, and added fellow New York-based comedian Lenny Marcus as his co-host. Marcus quit the podcast after ten months following several on-air and off-air disagreements between the two comedians. Brennan speculated on subsequent shows that Marcus "didn't want to do the road" and wanted a share of the money earned by the podcast despite not promoting the podcast on other shows.

Brennan continued on with MLC and where he brought in comedian and former Hot 97 radio personality Jimmy Martinez as a replacement for former co-host Marcus. However, Martinez's time as co-host was short lived after he had a near-physical altercation with Brennan after an on-air disagreement, in which Martinez grabbed at Brennan and proceeded to walk off set.

Martinez was replaced by sketch comic writer and comedian Brian McCarthy. McCarthy was also co-host of Brennan's Compound Media show, Burning Bridges. McCarthy eventually left after several off-air confrontations with Brennan, which boiled over due to an appearance by McCarthy on Bill Schulz's Compound Media show Mornin'!!!, of which Brennan disagreed with.

McCarthy was eventually replaced by comedian and former 100.7 WMMS: The Buzzard radio personality Chad Zumock. Zumock left the show in July 2021, but has since returned as a regular co-host, along with comedian, podcaster, and radio personality "The Reverend" Bob Levy. Brennan's MLC producer and audio engineer, Adam Hiniker, is also a regular, on-screen participant.

Misery Loves Company has featured such guests as Dave Attell, Jim Gaffigan, Patty Rosborough, Carie Karavas, Mario Bosco, Pat Dixon, Shuli Egar, Ken Mosca, Anthony Zenhauser, Alex Stein, Ray DeVito, Barry Katz, and Elisa Jordana.

Brennan releases premium audio and video episodes of MLC via subscription service Patreon, as well as free content on online video platform YouTube.

Other ventures
In 2018 he produced a live comedy show in New York City called White Guys Matter that was billed as "all white guys" and "no safe spaces" with the promise to "make comedy great again." Comedian Aaron Berg, who performed at the New York show, brought the show to Yuk Yuk's comedy club in Toronto, Canada that same year, causing several local comedians to take to social media to protest the show.

Former Opie and Anthony radio personality Anthony Cumia became a fan of Brennan's tirades against other comedians on MLC (including Brennan's brother, Neal), and brought Brennan to his Compound Media network in 2017, where Brennan hosted his second podcast, Burning Bridges, until Brennan left in 2019.

Brennan played himself in an episode of Pete Holmes' HBO series Crashing that aired in 2019. A roast of Kevin Brennan was held at The Stand comedy club in New York City that same year. Roasters at the event included comedians Dan Soder, Jim Norton (in character as Chip Chipperson), Krystyna Hutchinson and Corinne Fischer of the Guys We Fucked podcast, Patty Rosborough, Chad Zumock, and Mike Bocchetti.

In October 2022, Brennan, along with fellow comedian Bob Levy, opened a comedy club called the Brennan & Levy's Comedy Loft in Vineland, New Jersey.

Comedic style
Brennan's delivery has been described as "laid-back" and "laconic". He is also known for his insult comedy, including insulting members of the audience, part of a long tradition of New York comics like Andrew Dice Clay, Lisa Lampanelli and Don Rickles. Brennan is known for tackling taboo and hot-button subject matter such as racism, pedophilia and misogyny. As his podcast title Burning Bridges suggests, Brennan is also known for his tirades about, and clashes with, fellow comedians.

In a 2017 interview with New York magazine, comedian Jim Gaffigan was quoted as saying: "I am a New York comedian in the vein of like Dave Attell and Kevin Brennan, where they're supposed to laugh at your jokes and not like you."

Personal life
Brennan is married and resides in New Jersey.  His youngest brother is Neal Brennan, comedian and co-creator of Chappelle's Show. He dated comedian Sarah Silverman in 1988.

Filmography

Film

Television

References

External links

Brennan & Levy's Comedy Loft at Kaycee Ray's

Living people
American stand-up comedians
American comedy writers
American television writers
American male television writers
American podcasters
American people of Irish descent
Writers from Chicago
21st-century American comedians
1960 births
21st-century American screenwriters
Archbishop John Carroll High School alumni
21st-century American male writers
Writers from New Jersey
Comedians from New York (state)
Comedians from Illinois
Comedians from New Jersey
Writers from New York (state)